M. Bhaskaran (died 21 October 2020) was an Indian politician, and member of the Communist Party of India (Marxist). He was the mayor of Kozhikode from 2005 to 2010 and a member of the Kozhikode District Committee of CPI(M). He was from a small village Karaparamba in Kozhikode.

Bhaskaran joined CPI(M) in 1964. Since 1974, he has been a full-time activist.

References

Year of birth missing
2020 deaths
Communist Party of India (Marxist) politicians from Kerala
Mayors of Kozhikode
Malayali politicians
21st-century Indian politicians
People from Kozhikode district